Cuthill is a surname. Notable people with the surname include:

Elizabeth Cuthill (1923–2011), American mathematician
George Cuthill (born 1934), New Zealand footballer
Michael Cuthill, Australian environmentalist

See also
Cuthill, New Zealand, a suburb of Auckland, New Zealand